Eda Zeqiri (born August 7, 2004), is a Kosovan swimmer who competed in the women's 400m freestyle at the 2020 Summer Olympics.

References

External links
 

Living people
2004 births
Kosovan female swimmers
Olympic swimmers of Kosovo
Swimmers at the 2020 Summer Olympics
Mediterranean Games competitors for Kosovo
Swimmers at the 2018 Mediterranean Games